Kyra or Kyraonig is an Indian fictional character created by Himanshu Goel. She was launched in Jan 2022 as an Instagram profile. The account is India’s first Virtual Influencer. She has been featured on the digital cover of Travel and Leisure, India and has done several brand endorsements so far with brands like Amazon Prime Video, boAt and John Jacobs. As of December 2022, she has gained over 200,000 followers on her Instagram profile.

References

External links
 Kyra on Instagram

Virtual influencers
Instagram accounts
Fictional characters introduced in 2022